The 2018 Rally Argentina (formally known as the YPF Rally Argentina 2018) was a motor racing event for rally cars that was held over four days between 26 and 29 April 2018. It marked the thirty-eighth running of Rally Argentina, and was the fifth round of the 2018 World Rally Championship and its support categories, the WRC-2 and WRC-3 championships. The event was based in Villa Carlos Paz in Córdoba Province and consisted of eighteen special stages totalling  competitive kilometres.

Thierry Neuville and Nicolas Gilsoul were the defending rally winners. Ott Tänak and Martin Järveoja won the rally. Their team, Toyota Gazoo Racing WRT, were the manufacturers' winners, while the Škoda Motorsport crew of Pontus Tidemand and Jonas Andersson won the World Rally Championship-2 category in a Škoda Fabia R5.

Background

Championship standings prior to the event
Sébastien Ogier and Julien Ingrassia entered the round with a seventeen-point lead in the World Championships for Drivers and Co-drivers. In the World Championship for Manufacturers, Hyundai Shell Mobis WRT held a four-point lead over M-Sport Ford WRT.

Entry list
The following crews were entered into the rally. The event was open to crews competing in the World Rally Championship, World Rally Championship-2, and the World Rally Championship-3. The final entry list consisted of twelve World Rally Car entries and ten crews entered in the World Rally Championship-2. There were no entries for the World Rally Championship-3.

Report

Pre-event

Citroën expanded its operations to include a third entry. Craig Breen and Scott Martin returned to drive one car, having given up their seats in Mexico and Corsica to make way for Sébastien Loeb and Daniel Elena. Khalid Al-Qassimi and Chris Patterson are making their first appearance of the season, driving Citroën's third car.

Teemu Suninen and Mikko Markkula returned to drive M-Sport Ford's third entry. Suninen and Markkula had been replaced by tarmac specialists Bryan Bouffier and Xavier Panseri in Tour de Corse. Daniel Barritt also returned as Elfyn Evans' co-driver after being forced to miss the Tour de Corse to recover from a concussion sustained in an accident in Rally Mexico.

Thursday
Defending rally winner Thierry Neuville edged Ott Tänak's Toyota Yaris by 0.3 second over the mixed surface roads in the town centre. Championship leader Sébastien Ogier was a further 0.1 second back in third in a Fiesta. Andreas Mikkelsen was half a second off the pace, despite twice understeering through roundabouts. From fifth to ninth were Kris Meeke, Esapekka Lappi, Teemu Suninen, Dani Sordo, the Shakedown winner Jari-Matti Latvala. Elfyn Evans, who originally finished eleventh, climbed up to tenth after Craig Breen received a 10-second penalty for checking out late at the time control.

Friday
Although Ott Tänak got a half-spin in the second stage, he managed to gain a significant lead in subsequent stages, winning five of six special stages which earned him a 22.7-second lead over Kris Meeke, much to the astonishment of his rivals. Thierry Neuville ended the day at the third place, margined his teammate Dani Sordo by less than one second, while defending world champion Sébastien Ogier was a further 6.9 seconds behind. Craig Breen was seventh on the board, 41.2 seconds off the lead. Early leader Andreas Mikkelsen got a puncture in SS6, relegating him to seventh place, along with Esapekka Lappi who also suffered from two punctures. The Finn was in the thick of the podium battle but plunged to eighth. Elfyn Evans was ninth, the Welshman frustrated by his lack of pace, with Fiesta teammate Teemu Suninen completed the leaderboard. Jari-Matti Latvala was forced to retire from the rally after his Yaris' front right suspension and engine's oiling system sustained significant damage.

Saturday
Ott Tänak was almost unbeatable in the rally. He set another five fastest stage times out of seven. His lead is now up to 46.5 seconds overall. Thierry Neuville and Dani Sordo, who gained the podium place after Kris Meeke suffered a puncture and dropped to eighth, were the only two drivers to snatch stage victories from the Yaris diver. They were separated by 21.7 seconds. Defending world champion Sébastien Ogier and Andreas Mikkelsen climbed up to fourth and fifth overall respectively, followed by Esapekka Lappi, another 29.1 seconds behind. Elfyn Evans was seventh in another Fiesta, nearly three minutes off the lead. Teammate Teemu Suninen and WRC 2 leader Kalle Rovanperä finished in the top ten. Craig Breen rolled his C3 out of sixth, which damaged his roll cage. He was forced to retire.

Sunday
Ott Tänak dominated the rally and took his first rally victory of the season and first for his team, Toyota Gazoo Racing WRT. Thierry Neuville finished second with five Power Stage points, while his teammate Dani Sordo completed the podium. Defending world champion Sébastien Ogier finished fourth overall, margined Andreas Mikkelsen by just four seconds. Teammate Elfyn Evans finished sixth in another Fiesta, over three minutes off the lead. Kris Meeke finished at the seventh place after Saturday's puncture. Esapekka Lappi, Teemu Suninen and WRC 2 winner Pontus Tidemand, who recapture the position of category leader after Kalle Rovanperä rolled out in second to last stage, completed the leaderboard.

Classification

Top ten finishers
The following crews finished the rally in each class's top ten.

Other notable finishers
The following notable crews finished the rally outside top ten.

Special stages

Power stage
The Power stage was a 16.43 km stage at the end of the rally. Additional World Championship points were awarded to the five fastest crews.

Penalties
The following notable crews were given time penalty during the rally.

Retirements
The following notable crews retired from the event. Under Rally2 regulations, they were eligible to re-enter the event starting from the next leg. Crews that re-entered were given an additional time penalty.

Championship standings after the rally

Drivers' championships

Co-Drivers' championships

Manufacturers' and teams' championships

Notes

References

External links
  
 2018 Rally Argentina in e-wrc website
 The official website of the World Rally Championship

Argentina
2018 in Argentine motorsport
April 2018 sports events in South America
2018 Rally Argentina